and  are both painting techniques employed in  (ink based) in China and Japan, as seen in landscape paintings, involving an abstract simplification of forms and freedom of brushwork. The two terms are often confused with each other in ordinary use. Generally,  relies on a layered contrast black, gray and white, whereas  utilizes "splashes" of ink, without leaving clear contours or outlines. The style apparently started in the Tang Dynasty China with the painter Wang Qia (王洽, fl. 785-805, also known as Wang Mo), but unfortunately none of his paintings remains. According to Zhu Jingxuan:Whenever he wanted to paint a picture, Wang Mo would first drink wine, and when he was sufficiently drunk, would splash the ink onto the painting surface. Then, laughing and singing all the while, he would stamp on it with his feet and smear it with his hands, besides swashing and sweeping it with the brush. The ink would be thin in some places, rich in others; he would follow the shapes which brush and ink had produced, making these into mountains, rocks, clouds and mists, wash in wind and rain, with the suddenness of Creation. It was exactly like the cunning of a deity; when one examined the painting after it was finished he could see no traces of the puddles of ink.During the Song Dynasty, some landscapes of Mu Qi's paintings on the Xiao and Xiang rivers exhibit many of its characteristics, and were highly praised in Japan. It was with Yu Jian (玉澗) in China when we have the first paintings in the style, for example Evening Market. In Japan, these styles of painting were spread by the Japanese painter Sesshū Tōyō. Later, the Kano school of painting will also made many paintings in this style.

See also
 Art movement
 Creativity techniques
 List of art media
 List of artistic media
 List of art movements
 List of most expensive paintings
 List of most expensive sculptures
 List of art techniques
 List of sculptors

References 

Japanese painting
Painting techniques